Aleksandr Sergeyevich Pashutin (born January 28, 1943, Moscow, USSR) is a Soviet and Russian stage and film actor, People's Artist of the Russian Federation (1999).

Selected filmography
 1975: Bonus as Oleg Kachnov
 1976: How Czar Peter the Great Married Off His Moor as painter
 1977: White Bim Black Ear as dog show judge
 1977: The Second Attempt of Viktor Krokhin as Sergey Andreevich
 1977: Destiny as crazy man (uncredited)
 1980: Air Crew as a passenger with a dislocated jaw
 1980: Investigation Held by ZnaToKi as Gorobets
 1980: The Evening Labyrinth as waiter
 1980: White Snow of Russia as Semyonov
 1982: Incident at Map Grid 36-80 as Captain Gremyachkin
 1982: The Train Has Stopped as train passenger
 1983: Quarantine as colleague of the grandmother
 1983: From the Life of a Chief of the Criminal Police as driver Utkin
 1983: Start Liquidation as Platonov
 1984: TASS Is Authorized to Declare... as Gmyrya
 1984: Planet Parade as Spirkin, architect
 1986: Plumbum, or The Dangerous Game as Ruslan's father
 1987: Gardes-Marines, Ahead! as Yakovlev
 1988: The Adventures of Quentin Durward, Marksman of the Royal Guard as Olivier le Daim
 1991: Rock'n'roll for Princesses as advisor
 1991: The Inner Circle as train commandant
 1991: Promised Heaven as engine driver
 1992: Encore, Once More Encore! as Major Skidonenko
 1993: Prediction as conductor
 1996: Hello, Fools! as  red commissioner
 2000: Old Hags as lawyer
 2000: Still Waters as hotel employee
 2005: The Fall of the Empire as general Grigoriev
 2007: Russian Translation as general Sorokin
 2007: Attack on Leningrad as Tregub
 2009: The Return of the Musketeers, or The Treasures of Cardinal Mazarin as Paul
 2010: Burnt by the Sun 2 as head of the Gulag
 2012: Rzhevsky Versus Napoleon as Jacques

References

External links

1943 births
Living people
Soviet male stage actors
Russian male film actors
Russian male television actors
Male actors from Moscow
Russian male stage actors
20th-century Russian male actors
21st-century Russian male actors
Soviet male actors
Honored Artists of the Russian Federation
Moscow Art Theatre School alumni
People's Artists of Russia